Pietro Zucchetti (born 25 January 1981 in Brescia) is an Italian sailor. He competed in the 470 class with Gabrio Zandona at the 2012 Summer Olympics.

References
 
 London2012.com

1981 births
Living people
Sportspeople from Brescia
Italian male sailors (sport)
Olympic sailors of Italy
Sailors at the 2012 Summer Olympics – 470
Sailors at the 2016 Summer Olympics – 49er